At the end of the Cold War in 1989 the Royal Air Force structure was as follows:

The Chief of the Air Staff was an Air Chief Marshal, who commanded the Royal Air Force. He was a member of the Chiefs of Staff Committee, the Defence Council, and the Air Force Board, which administered the Royal Air Force. The following positions were part of the Air Force Board:

 Secretary of State for Defence as Chairman
 Minister of State for the Armed Forces as Vice-Chairman
 Minister of State for Defence Procurement
 Under-Secretary of State for the Armed Forces
 Under-Secretary of State for Defence Procurement
 Chief of the Air Staff (with the rank of Air Chief Marshal; generally the Chief of Air Staff would be promoted to the rank of Marshal of the Royal Air Force at the conclusion of their term as CAS)
 Air Member for Personnel (with the rank of Air Marshal)
 Air Member for Supply and Organisation (with the rank of Air Marshal)
 Controller of Aircraft (usually an RAF officer with the rank of Air Marshal, though in 1989 it was held by a member of the Civil Service)
 Second Permanent Under-Secretary of State and Controller R & D Establishments, Research and Nuclear

The strength of the Royal Air Force in 1989 was 93,300 men.

RAF Strike Command 
RAF Strike Command commanded all operational Royal Air Force units in the United Kingdom. Its Commander-in-Chief was Air Chief Marshal Sir Patrick Hine, who doubled as NATO, Commander-in-Chief United Kingdom Air Forces (CINCUKAIR), which was a major subordinate command under NATO's Supreme Allied Commander Europe. In 1989 RAF Strike Command consisted of three major operational commands, a few minor units, and had administrative control of the Royal Observer Corps, which was tasked with nuclear warfare analysis and manned the UK's nuclear fallout warning service.

 UK Regional Air Operations Centre, RAF High Wycombe
 No. 1 Group, RAF Upavon
 No. 11 (Air Defence) Group, RAF Bentley Priory
 No. 18 (Maritime) Group, Northwood Headquarters, doubled as NATO Commander Maritime Air Eastern Atlantic (COMAIREASTLANT) and Commander Allied Maritime Air Force Channel (COMAIRCHAN)
 Royal Observer Corps, RAF Bentley Priory, administrative control, but financed mostly by the Home Office under UK Warning and Monitoring Organisation
 Central Tactics and Trials Organisation, RAF High Wycombe
 Strike Command Air-to-Air Missile Establishment, RAF Valley
 Strike Command Integrated Communications System

No. 1 Group 

No. 1 Group was commanded by Air Vice-Marshal Charles John Thomson (till Feb 1989) then Ronald Andrew Fellowes Wilson (from Feb 1989) based at RAF Upavon. The group contained varied aircraft, with the majority being strike aircraft. The group's main focus would have been bombing raids on advancing Soviet ground forces in Northern Germany as directed by NATO's Supreme Allied Commander Europe. The group fielded six squadrons, which could be armed with WE.177 tactical nuclear weapons, and tanker aircraft to ensure that it could deliver nuclear strikes deep inside enemy territory.

 No. 1 Group, RAF Upavon
 Mobile Air Operations Teams, RAF Upavon
 RAF Aldergrove (under operational control of Headquarters Northern Ireland)
 No. 72 Squadron RAF, (Wessex HC.2)
 No. 3 Squadron RAF Regiment, (Field)
 RAF Benson
No. 115 Squadron RAF, (Radio and airport navigation aid calibration, Andover C.1/E.3/E.3A)
 Queen's Flight, (Royal Flight, BAe 146 CC.2, Wessex HCC.4)
 RAF Brize Norton
 No. 10 Squadron RAF, (Transport, 13x Vickers VC10 C.1)
 No. 101 Squadron RAF, (Aerial refueling, 9x Vickers VC10 K.2/K.3)
 No. 216 Squadron RAF, (Aerial refueling and cargo, 9x Tristar 500 K.1/KC.1)
 No. 241 Operational Conversion Unit RAF, (Trained Vickers VC10 and Tristar 500 crews)
 No. 19 Squadron RAF Regiment, (Air Defence, Rapier launch stations, defending RAF Upper Heyford and RAF Fairford)
 RAF Coltishall
 No. 6 Squadron RAF, (Jaguar GR.1A)note 1
 No. 41 Squadron RAF, (Reconnaissance, Jaguar GR.1A)
 No. 54 Squadron RAF, (Jaguar GR.1A)note 1
 RAF Honington
 No. 13 Squadron RAF, (Reconnaissance, Tornado GR.1A, activated 1 January 1990)
 No. 45 Squadron RAF, (Tornado Weapons Conversion Unit, Tornado GR.1)note 1
 No. 20 Squadron RAF Regiment, (Air Defence, Rapier launch stations, defending RAF Alconbury, RAF Mildenhall and RAF Lakenheath)
 RAF Lyneham
 No. 24 Squadron RAF, (Tactical airlift, Hercules C.1/C.3)
 No. 30 Squadron RAF, (Tactical airlift, Hercules C.1/C.3)
 No. 47 Squadron RAF, (Tactical airlift, Hercules C.1/C.3)
 No. 70 Squadron RAF, (Tactical airlift, Hercules C.1/C.3)
 No. 242 Operational Conversion Unit RAF, (Hercules C.1/C.3)
 RAF Marham
No. 27 Squadron RAF, (Tornado GR.1)
 No. 617 Squadron RAF, (Tornado GR.1)
 No. 55 Squadron RAF (Aerial refueling, 14x Victor K.2)
 RAF Northolt
 No. 32 Squadron RAF, (VIP flight, 12x BAe 125 CC.2/CC.3, Andover CC.2, Gazelle HCC.4 helicopters)
 RAF Odiham
 No. 7 Squadron RAF, (Air assault, CH-47 Chinook HC.1)
 No. 33 Squadron RAF, (Tactical airlift, Puma HC.1)
 No. 240 Operational Conversion Unit RAF, (Puma HC.1, CH-47 Chinook HC.1)
 Support Helicopter Standards and Evaluation Flight
 RAF Wittering
 No. 1 Squadron RAF, (Harrier GR.5)
 No. 233 Operational Conversion Unit RAF, (Harrier GR.5)
 RAF Brawdy
 No. 1 Tactical Weapons Unit RAF
 No. 79 (R) Squadron RAF, (Hawk T.1A)
 No. 234 (R) Squadron RAF, (Hawk T.1A)
 RAF Chivenor
 No. 2 Tactical Weapons Unit RAF
 No. 63 (R) Squadron RAF, (Hawk T.1A)
 No. 151 (R) Squadron RAF, (Hawk T.1A)

Note 1: Unit had a nuclear strike role with WE.177 tactical nuclear weapons.

No. 1 Group also administered the flying units detached to Belize and the Falklands:

 British Forces Belize, Belize City, Belize
 Belize Airport, Ladyville
 No. 1417 Flight RAF, (Harrier GR.3)
 No. 1563 Flight RAF, (Puma HC.1)
 British Forces Falkland Islands, RAF Mount Pleasant, Falkland Islands
RAF Mount Pleasant
 No. 78 Squadron RAF, (Air assault, CH-47 Chinook HC.1, Search & Rescue, Sea King HAR.3)
 No. 1435 Flight RAF, (Phantom FGR.2)
 No. 1312 Flight RAF, (Aerial refueling, Hercules C.1K)

No. 11 (Air Defence) Group 

No. 11 (Air Defence) Group was commanded by Air Vice-Marshal Roger Hewlett Palin (till March) then William John Wratten (from March) based at RAF Bentley Priory. The group was to defend the United Kingdom against all aerial threats and fielded exclusively fighter aircraft and one air defence missile squadron. In 1989 the Royal Air Force was speedily replacing its aging Phantom fighters with the more modern and more capable Tornado F3, whose superior supersonic acceleration, powerful radar and beyond-visual-range missiles made it the ideal platform to intercept and destroy Soviet bombers attacking the UK. In case of war, No. 11 (Air Defence) Group would have taken command of the five UK-based Hawk T.1 training squadrons, which, armed with AIM-9L Sidewinder missiles would have become the last line of defense against Soviet air attacks.

 No. 11 (Air Defence) Group, RAF Bentley Priory
 RAF Coningsby
 No. 5 Squadron RAF, (Tornado F3)
 No. 29 Squadron RAF, (Tornado F3)
 No. 229 Operational Conversion Unit RAF, (Tornado F3)
 Battle of Britain Memorial Flight
 RAF Leeming
 No. 11 Squadron RAF, (Tornado F3)
 No. 23 Squadron RAF, (Tornado F3)
 No. 25 Squadron RAF, (Tornado F3, operational from 1 August 1989)
 RAF Leuchars
 No. 43 Squadron RAF, (Tornado F3, switch from Phantom FG.1 to Tornado F3 completed in September 1989)
 No. 111 Squadron RAF, (Phantom FG.1, began to receive Tornados in January 1990)
 No. 228 Operational Conversion Unit RAF, (Phantom FGR.2)
 No. 27 Squadron RAF Regiment, (Air Defence, Rapier launch stations)
 RAF West Raynham
 No. 66 Squadron RAF Regiment, (Air Defence, Rapier launch stations, defending RAF Bentwaters and RAF Woodbridge)
 No. 85 Squadron RAF, (Bloodhound Mark II surface-to-air missiles; D, E and F flights joined the squadron when No. 25 Squadron converted to Tornado F3 on 1 August 1989.)
 A Flight at RAF West Raynham
 B Flight at RAF North Coates
 C Flight at RAF Bawdsey
 D Flight at RAF Barkston Heath
 E Flight at RAF Wattisham
 F Flight at RAF Wyton
 RAF Wattisham
 No. 56 Squadron RAF, (Phantom FGR.2)
 No. 74 Squadron RAF, (Phantom F-4J (UK))
 RAF Fylingdales
 UK Ballistic Missile Early Warning System

No. 18 (Maritime) Group 

No. 18 (Maritime) Group was commanded by Air Marshal Andrew L. Roberts (till August) then David Emmerson (from August) based at the Northwood Headquarters. During war the Commander of No. 18 Group would also assume the titles of Commander Maritime Air Eastern Atlantic (COMAIREASTLANT) and Commander Allied Maritime Air Force Channel (COMAIRCHAN). In case of war No. 18 Group's Maritime Air Region North would have assumed the titles of NATO Commander Maritime Air Northern Sub-Area (COMMAIRNORLANT) and NATO Commander Maritime Air Nore Sub-Area Channel (COMAIRNORECHAN) and taken command of Norwegian Air Force and US Navy P-3 Orion anti-submarine aircraft at Andøya Air Station and Naval Air Station Keflavik respectively, as well as the Keflavik-based US Air Force F-15C/D Eagles to prevent vessels of the Soviet Navy's Northern Fleet from passing through the GIUK gap.

The Maritime Headquarters Units provided additional reserve personnel to man the operations rooms and communications centres that 
directed 18 Group and the Royal Navy. 

The two Maritime Air Regions were amalgamated in 1987, and Pitrevie became the back up to Northwood, becoming the location of Air Officer Scotland and Northern Ireland only. 

 No. 18 (Maritime) Group, Northwood Headquarters, doubled as NATO Commander Maritime Air Eastern Atlantic (COMAIREASTLANT) and Commander Allied Maritime Air Force Channel (COMAIRCHAN)
Maritime Air Region North, RAF Pitreavie Castle, Rosyth, commanded by an Air Vice-Marshal, who doubled as RAF Air Officer Scotland and Northern Ireland, and NATO Commander Maritime Air Northern Sub-Area (COMMAIRNORLANT) and Commander Maritime Air Nore Sub-Area Channel (COMAIRNORECHAN)
RAF Kinloss
 No. 120 Squadron RAF, (Maritime patrol, Nimrod MR.2)
 No. 201 Squadron RAF, (Maritime patrol, Nimrod MR.2)
 No. 206 Squadron RAF, (Maritime patrol, Nimrod MR.2)
 RAF Lossiemouth
 No. 8 Squadron RAF, (Airborne early warning and control, Avro Shackleton AEW.2, being replaced by 7x Sentry AEW.1 aircraft, squadron was part of No. 11 (Air Defence) Group)
 No. 12 Squadron RAF, (Maritime attack, Buccaneer S.2B )note 1
 No. 208 Squadron RAF, (Maritime attack, Buccaneer S.2B )note 1
 No. 226 Operational Conversion Unit RAF, (Land strike, Jaguar GR.1A, unit was part of No. 1 Group)note 1
 No. 237 Operational Conversion Unit RAF, (Maritime attack, Buccaneer S.2B)note 1
 No. 48 Squadron RAF Regiment, (Air Defence, Rapier launch stations)
 Maritime Air Region South, Admiralty House, Mount Wise, Plymouth, commanded by an Air Vice-Marshal, who doubled as NATO Commander Maritime Air Central Sub-Area (COMMAIRCENTLANT) and Commander Maritime Air Plymouth Sub-Area Channel (COMAIRPLYMCHAN)
 RAF St Mawgan
 No. 42 Squadron RAF, (Maritime patrol, Nimrod MR.2)
 No. 236 Operational Conversion Unit RAF, (Nimrod MR.2)
 RAF Wyton
 No. 51 Squadron RAF, (Signals intelligence, 3x Nimrod R.1)
 No. 100 Squadron RAF, (Electronic countermeasures, Canberra T.17)
 No. 360 Squadron RAF, (Electronic countermeasures, Canberra T.17)
 No. 231 Operational Conversion Unit RAF, (Canberra T.17)
 No. 1 Photographic Reconnaissance Unit RAF, (Canberra PR.9)
 Electronic Warfare and Avionic Unit
 Search and Rescue Wing, RAF Finningley
 No. 22 Squadron RAF, (SAR, Flights of 2x Wessex HC.2 at RAF Chivenor, RAF Leuchars, RAF Valley)
 No. 202 Squadron RAF, (SAR, squadron moved to RAF Boulmer in 1989, Flights of 2x Sea King HAR.3 at RAF Boulmer, RAF Leconfield, RAF Coltishall, RAF Brawdy, RAF Lossiemouth, RAF Manston (flight moved to RAF Wattisham in 1989)
 Search and Rescue Training Unit
 Search and Rescue Engineering
 No. 1 (County of Hertford) Maritime Headquarters Unit, RAF Northwood (augmented HQ 18 Group)
 No. 2 (City of Edinburgh) Maritime Headquarters Unit, Edinburgh(augmented HQ Northern Maritime Air Region & RAF Pitreavie Castle operations centre after 1987)
 No. 3 (County of Devon) Maritime Headquarters Unit, RAF Mount Batten (augmented Southern Maritime Air Region)

Note 1: Unit had a nuclear strike role with WE.177 tactical nuclear weapons.

Royal Observer Corps 
The Royal Observer Corps (ROC) was commanded by the Commandant Royal Observer Corps with the rank of Air Commodore and had its headquarter at RAF Bentley Priory. The corps was tasked with detecting and reporting nuclear explosions and associated fall-out as the field force for the United Kingdom Warning and Monitoring Organisation, (UKWMO). By the late 1980s the ROC comprised 69 professional full-time officers, approximately 10,500 civilian spare-time volunteers, and over 100 Ministry of Defence (MoD) civilian support staff.

RAF Germany 

Royal Air Force Germany (RAFG) consisted of air force units located in Germany as part of the UK's commitment to the defence of Western Europe during the Cold War. In wartime the Air Marshal in command of RAFG would also have assumed the command of NATO's Second Allied Tactical Air Force. RAFG's main missions were to protect the British Army of the Rhine from Warsaw Pact air attacks and bomb hostile armor formation. In case Soviet spearheads would have breached the Weser-line on the Western side of the Upper Weser Valley the RAFG was trained and equipped to attack enemy troop concentrations to the East of the Weser with tactical nuclear weapons.

To fulfill its mission RAFG had a varied mix of aircraft under its command: Phantom FGR.2 fighters, Tornado GR.1 fighter-bombers, helicopters, and Harrier GR.5 vertical/short takeoff and landing (V/STOL) jet aircraft. As the most forward deployed units the Harriers would have dispersed to auxiliary airfields and highway strips during the transition to war to protect them from Soviet air attacks. The Army's 38th Engineer Regiment and the Royal Auxiliary Air Force Regiment's No. 2624 (County of Oxford) Field Squadron would have supported the Harrier Force at these airfields.

 Royal Air Force Germany, RAF Rheindahlen, doubles as commander of NATO's Second Allied Tactical Air Force
 RAF Germany Photographic Reproduction Unit, RAF Rheindahlen
 RAF Bruggen
 No. 9 Squadron, (Tornado GR.1)note 1
 No. 14 Squadron, (Tornado GR.1)note 1
 No. 17 Squadron, (Tornado GR.1)note 1
 No. 31 Squadron, (Tornado GR.1)note 1
 No. 37 Squadron RAF Regiment, (Air Defence, Rapier launch stations)
 No. 51 Squadron RAF Regiment, (Light Armour, Spartan, Scorpion)
 No. 11 Signals Unit
 No. 431 Maintenance Unit RAF, (Airframe repair)
 No. 431 Maintenance Unit Detachment, RAF Laarbruch
 RAF Gütersloh
 No. 3 Squadron, (Harrier GR.5)
 No. 4 Squadron, (Harrier GR.5)
 No. 18 Squadron, (CH-47 Chinook HC.1, supporting British Army of the Rhine)
 No. 230 Squadron, (Puma HC.1, supporting British Army of the Rhine)
 No. 63 Squadron RAF Regiment, (Air Defence, Rapier launch stations)
 RAF Laarbruch
 No. 2 Squadron, (Reconnaissance, Jaguar GR.1A/T.2A, being replaced with Tornado GR.1A from January 1989)
 No. 15 Squadron, (Tornado GR.1)note 1
 No. 16 Squadron, (Tornado GR.1)note 1
 No. 20 Squadron, (Tornado GR.1)note 1
 No. 1 Squadron RAF Regiment, (Light Armour, Spartan, Scorpion)
 No. 26 Squadron RAF Regiment, (Air Defence, Rapier launch stations)
 RAF Wildenrath
 No. 19 Squadron, (Phantom FGR.2)
 No. 92 Squadron, (Phantom FGR.2)
 No. 60 Squadron, (Transport, Andover CC.2, Pembroke C.1)
 No. 16 Squadron RAF Regiment, (Air Defence, Rapier launch stations)
 No. 4 Wing RAF Regiment, RAF Wildenrath, administrative control of West Germany-based Rapier squadrons defending Royal Air Force Germany airfields
 No. 33 Wing RAF Regiment, RAF Gütersloh, administrative control of West Germany-based light armour squadrons defending Royal Air Force Germany airfields
 No. 54 Signals Unit, Celle, (co-located with 14th Signal Regiment (Electronic Warfare), Royal Signals)
 No. 735 Signals Unit, Borgholzhausen

Note 1: Unit with nuclear strike role with 18x WE.177 tactical nuclear weapons.

RAF Support Command 

RAF Support Command was commanded by an Air Marshal based at RAF Brampton. During war the command would have moved to its Emergency War Headquarter in a bunker at RAF Holmpton. Support Command had been created in 1973 by merging RAF Maintenance Command, with No. 90 (Signals) Group. In 1977 Support Command  1977 absorbed Training Command making it additionally responsible for all RAF ground and aircrew training.

In 1989 RAF Support Command was responsible for all signals under, logistics, maintenance (Air Officer Commanding Maintenance Units and Air Officer Maintenance, RAF Support Command), personnel management, ground transport, supply, basic flying training, ground crew training (Air Officer Commanding Training Units and Air Officer Training, RAF Support Command), ordnance, recruitment, medical services, air base services, IT systems. etc. Air Officer Commanding were Air Vice-Marshals. Below follows a provisional, unverified, partial listing of this large organisation.

AOC Training Units and AO Training 
The Air Officer Commanding Training Units and Air Officer Training was an Air Vice-Marshal responsible for all training establishments of the RAF. The AOC Training Units and AO Training administered the following training establishments and units:

 Air Officer Commanding Training Units and Air Officer Training
 Royal Air Force Staff College Bracknell, commanded by an Air Vice-Marshal
 RAF Scampton
 Central Flying School (Instructor Training, Bulldog T.1, Hawk T.1, Gazelle HT.3)
 RAF Aerobatic Team (Red Arrows), (Hawk T.1)
 RAF Linton-on-Ouse
 No. 1 Flying Training School, (Provost T.5A, being replaced by Tucano T.1)
 RAF Shawbury
 No. 2 Flying Training School, (Helicopter flying training, Gazelle HT.3, Wessex HC.2)
 Central Flying School (Gazelle), (Gazelle HT.3)
 Central Air Traffic Control School
 RAF Cranwell
 Royal Air Force College Cranwell, commanded by an Air Vice-Marshal
 Initial Officers Training
 Engineering and Supply Officers Specialist Training
 No. 3 Flying Training School, (Activated 1 February 1989, Jet Provost T.3A, being replaced by Tucano T.1)
 RAF Valley
 No. 4 Flying Training School (Hawk T.1)
 Central Flying School Advanced Training Unit, (Hawk T.1)
 Search and Rescue & Mountain Rescue Training Unit, (2x Wessex HC.2)
 RAF Finningley
 No. 6 Flying Training School
 Low Level and Air Defence Training Squadron, (Low level navigation training, Jet Provost T.5B)
 Multi-engine Training Squadron, (Operational navigation training for multi-engine pilots, Jetstream T.1)
 RAF Church Fenton
 No. 7 Flying Training School, (Jet Provost T.3A, being replaced by Tucano T.1)
 Refresher Flying Squadron
 RAF Brize Norton
 No. 1 Parachute Training School
 RAF Movements School
 RAF Locking
 No. 1 Radio School
 RAF Halton
 No. 1 Technical Training School
 RAF Cosford
 No. 2 Technical Training School
 RAF School of Physical Training
 Joint Services School of Photography
 RAF St Athan
 No. 14 Technical Training School
 SG Ground Defence
 RAF Boscombe Down
 Empire Test Pilots' School (RAF Element)
 RAF Mount Batten
 Combat Survival and Rescue School
 RAF Digby
 Aerial Erector School
 RAF West Drayton
 Flight Control School, (moved to RAF Boulmer in 1990)
 RAF Rochester
 Defence Explosive Ordnance Disposal School
 RAF Wyton
 Joint Photographic Interpretation School
 RAF Lossiemouth
 Buccaneer and Jaguar Ground Servicing
 RAF Odiham
 Chinook Ground Servicing
 Support Helicopter Standardisation and Evaluation Unit
 RAF Wittering
 Harrier Ground Servicing
 RAF Kinloss
 Nimrod Ground Servicing
 RAF Cottesmore
 Tri-National Tornado Training Establishment, (19x Tornado GR.1 (UK), 6x Tornado IDS (Italy), 23x Tornado IDS (West Germany); 12x per flying squadron)
 A-Squadron (German Air Force squadron commander)
 B-Squadron (Royal Air Force squadron commander)
 C-Squadron (Italian Air Force squadron commander)
 S-Squadron (Follow-on and instructor pilot training)
 Ground School (Theory lessons and simulator training)
 Tornado Ground Servicing
 RAF Marham
 Victor Ground Servicing
 RAF Sealand
 Civilian Technical Training
 RAF Hereford
 Airmens' Command School
 RAF Henlow
 Officers' Command School
 RAF Biggin Hill
 Personnel Selection Training School
 RAF Swinderby
 Elementary Flying Training School (Chipmunk T.10 trainers)
 RAF School of Recruit Training
 RAF Newton
 RAF School of Education and Training Support
 Amport House
 RAF Chaplains School
 RAF Uxbridge
 Music School
 RAF Aldershot
 RAF School of Catering
 RAF Manston
 RAF Fire Services Central Training Establishment
 RNAS Culdrose
 Sea King Training Unit - joint unit of RAF and Fleet Air Arm
 RAF Shawbury
 Area Radar Training School
 RAF Jurby Head, air weapons range

AOC Air Cadets & Commandant Air Training Corps 
 Air Officer Commanding Air Cadets & Commandant Air Training Corps, Air Commodore, RAF Syerston
 Air Cadet Organisation
 Girls Venture Corps Air Cadets
 Air Training Corps
 Air Experience Flights, (Chipmunk T.10 trainers)
 No. 1 Air Experience Flight RAF, RAF Manston
 No. 2 Air Experience Flight RAF, RAF Hurn
 No. 3 Air Experience Flight RAF, RAF Filton (moved to RAF Hullavington in June 1989)
 No. 4 Air Experience Flight RAF, RAF Exeter
 No. 5 Air Experience Flight RAF, Cambridge Airport
 No. 6 Air Experience Flight RAF, RAF Abingdon
 No. 7 Air Experience Flight RAF, RAF Newton
 No. 8 Air Experience Flight RAF, RAF Shawbury
 No. 9 Air Experience Flight RAF, RAF Finningley
 No. 10 Air Experience Flight RAF, RAF Woodvale
 No. 11 Air Experience Flight RAF, RAF Leeming
 No. 12 Air Experience Flight RAF, RAF Turnhouse
 No. 13 Air Experience Flight RAF, RAF Aldergrove
 RAF Syerston
 Air Cadet Central Gliding School 
 Central Glider Maintenance Flight
 Volunteer Gliding Squadrons
 28x Volunteer Gliding Schools
 University Air Squadrons (all with Bulldog T.1)
East Lowlands Universities Air Squadron
Aberdeen, Dundee and St Andrews Universities Air Squadron
University of Birmingham Air Squadron
Bristol University Air Squadron
Cambridge University Air Squadron
Northumbrian Universities Air Squadron
East Midlands Universities Air Squadron
Edinburgh University Air Squadron
Universities of Glasgow and Strathclyde Air Squadron
Yorkshire Universities Air Squadron
Liverpool University Air Squadron
University of London Air Squadron
Manchester and Salford Universities Air Squadron
Northern Ireland Universities Air Squadron
Oxford University Air Squadron
Southampton University Air Squadron
Universities of Wales Air Squadron

AOC Signals Units and AO Signals 
The Air Officer Commanding Signals Units and Air Officer Signals was an Air Vice-Marshal responsible for all signals units of the RAF. Besides Royal Signals Air Support Signals Units at operational RAF bases and stations, the AOC Signals Units and AO Signals administered the following units.

 Air Officer Commanding Signals Units and Air Officer Signals
 RAF Bampton Castle, (High frequency radio communications)
 No. 2 Signals Unit
 No. 81 Signals Unit
 No. 81 Signals Unit (Detachment), RAF Kinloss
 No. 81 Signals Unit (Detachment), RAF St Mawgan
 RAF Boddington, (Computerised relay communications)
 No. 9 Signals Unit
 RAF Digby, (Communications security)
 No. 399 Signals Unit
 No. 591 Signals Unit
 RAF Gibraltar
 No. 291 Signals Unit
 RAF Henlow
 HQ RAF Support Command Signals Staff
 RAF Signals Engineering Establishment
 Radio Engineering Unit
 Exhibition Production Flight
 RAF Lindholme, (Automatic routing)
 No. 840 Signals Unit
 RAF Rudloe Manor
 HQ Fixed Telecommunications System
 Controller Defence Communication Network
 No. 6 Signals Unit
 RAF Spadeadam, (Electronic warfare training)
 No. 721 Signals Unit
 RAF Wattisham
 No. 144 Signals Unit
 RAF Woolwich
 Special Signals Unit

Additional specialized signals units were detached to Royal Air Force Germany, British Sector Berlin, British Forces Gibraltar, British Forces Falkland Islands and British Forces Cyprus.

AOC Maintenance Units and AO Maintenance 
 Air Officer Commanding Maintenance Units and Air Officer Maintenance
 RAF Quedgeley
 No. 7 Maintenance Unit RAF, (Equipment supply depot)
 RAF Chilmark
 No. 11 Maintenance Unit RAF, (Ammunition supply depot)
 RAF Carlisle
 No. 14 Maintenance Unit RAF, (Equipment storage depot)
 RAF Stafford
 No. 2 Mechanical Transport Squadron
 No. 16 Maintenance Unit RAF, (Equipment storage depot)
 RAF Sealand
 No. 30 Maintenance Unit
 RAF Cardington
 No. 217 Maintenance Unit
 RAF Abingdon
 Aircraft Maintenance Squadron, (servicing Hawk, Jaguar and Buccaneer aircraft)
 Repair and Salvage Squadron
 RAF Scampton
 Tornado Radar Repair Unit
 RAF Kemble
 No. 5 Maintenance Unit
 RAF St Athan
 No. 19 Maintenance Unit RAF, (Equipment storage depot)
 RAF Aldergrove
 No. 23 Maintenance Unit
 RAF Hartlebury
 No. 25 Maintenance Unit
 RAF Leconfield
 No. 60 Maintenance Unit
 RAF Bicester
 No. 71 Maintenance Unit
 RAF Kinloss
 Nimrod Major Servicing Unit
 RAF Marham
 Victor Major Maintenance Unit
 RAF Wildenrath
 No. 402 Air Stores Park
 RAF Hendon
 RAF Supply Control Centre
 RAF Swanton Manor
 Maintenance Analysis and Computing Establishment
 RAF Swanton Morley
 Central Servicing Development Establishment

AO Administration and AO Directly Administered Units 
 Air Officer Administration and Air Officer Directly Administered Units
 RAF Benson
 RAF Support Command Flight Checking Unit
 RAF Farnborough
 Royal Aerospace Establishment
 RAF Institute of Aviation Medicine
 Meteorological Research Flight
 RAF Boscombe Down
 Aeroplane and Armament Experimental Establishment
 RAF North Luffenham
 No. 5131 (BD) Squadron RAF (Explosive Ordnance Demolition)
 RAF Ascension Island
 Hercules Flight
 RAF Uxbridge
 Queen's Colour Squadron of the RAF
 Military Air Traffic Organization
 RAF Woolwich
 Air Publications and Form Store

RAF Regiment 
The RAF Regiment was headed by the Commandant-General, RAF Regiment and Director-General of Security with the rank of Air Vice-Marshal, who was responsible for security at all RAF installations. The RAF Regiment served as the Royal Air Force's airfield defence corps. The regiment administered, trained and maintained its squadron, which operationally were under the commanders of the airfields they were assigned to. There were four types of squadron: Field (Light Infantry) and Light Armour squadrons as airfield ground defence forces, Air Defence squadrons, and one Light Armour / Paratroopers Squadron to seize and secure enemy airfields. The regiment fielded 16 squadrons and the Royal Auxiliary Air Force Regiment (RAuxAF) fielded eight reserve squadrons. The Regiment also provided the RAF Fire Service sections at all RAF airfields and trained firefighters and rescue personnel at its main base RAF Catterick.

The list below only lists squadrons that were under command of the regiment in 1989; the squadrons assigned to other units are listed under the airfields where they were based.

 RAF Regiment, RAF Catterick
 RAF Fire Service, RAF Catterick
 No. 3 Wing RAF Regiment, RAF Catterick, administrative control of unassigned UK-based squadrons
 No. 58 Squadron RAF Regiment, RAF Catterick, (Light Armour, Spartan, Scorpion)
 No. 5 Wing RAF Regiment, RAF Hullavington, administrative control of light armour squadrons supporting the UK's Harrier Force
 No. 2 Squadron RAF Regiment, RAF Hullavington, (Light Armour / Paratroopers, Spartan, Scorpion)
 No. 15 Squadron RAF Regiment, RAF Hullavington, (Light Armour, Spartan, Scorpion)
 No. 6 Wing RAF Regiment, RAF West Raynham, administrative control of UK-based Rapier squadrons defending US Air Force Third Air Force airfields in the UK

Royal Auxiliary Air Force 
The Royal Auxiliary Air Force (RAuxAF) was commanded by an Air Vice-Marshal and provided reinforcements to the Royal Air Force, which were manned by civilians and called upon in times of need or war. Although all RAuxAF units had been disbanded in 1957 it lived on in three Maritime Headquarter Units, which provided augmentation personnel for No. 18 (Maritime) Group. In 1979 three Field Squadrons were formed to provide ground airfield defence. During the 1980s additional squadrons and flights were raised and by 1989 the RAuxAF fielded three Maritime Headquarter Units, two administrative wings, seven RAuxAF Regiment squadrons, two support squadrons and three airfield defence flights.

 Royal Auxiliary Air Force
 No. 4624 (County of Oxford) Movements Squadron RAuxAF, RAF Brize Norton
 No. 4626 (County of Wiltshire) Aeromedical Evacuation Squadron RAuxAF, RAF Hullavington
 No. 1310 Wing RAuxAF Regiment, RAF Catterick, administrative control of RAuxAF Regiment Field squadrons, (formed 13 June 1989)
 No. 2503 (County of Lincoln) Squadron RAuxAF Regiment, RAF Waddington, (Field)
 No. 2620 (County of Norfolk) Squadron RAuxAF Regiment, RAF Marham, (Field)
 No. 2622 (Highland) Squadron RAuxAF Regiment, RAF Lossiemouth, (Field)
 No. 2623 (East Anglian) Squadron RAuXAF Regiment, RAF Honington, (Field)
 No. 2624 (County of Oxford) Squadron RAuxAF Regiment, RAF Brize Norton, (Field, assigned to support the Harrier Force in West Germany)
 No. 2625 (County of Cornwall) Squadron RAuXAF Regiment, RAF St Mawgan, (Field)
 No. 1339 Wing RAuxAF Regiment, RAF Waddington, administrative control of RAuxAF Regiment SHORAD squadrons, (formed 1 October 1989)
 No. 2729 (City of Lincoln) Squadron RAuXAF Regiment, RAF Waddington, (SHORAD)
 No. 2890 Squadron RAuXAF Regiment, RAF Waddington, (SHORAD, formed 1 October 1989)
 RAF Brampton Airfield Defence Force Flight (tasked to defend RAF Support Command)
 RAF High Wycombe Airfield Defence Force Flight (tasked to defend RAF Strike Command)
 RAF Lyneham Airfield Defence Force Flight (tasked to defend the Hercules Force)
 RAF St Athan Royal Auxiliary Air Force Support Force Flight (Trial formation)

Note: The Royal Hong Kong Auxiliary Air Force was responsible to Commander, British Forces Hong Kong.

Royal Air Force Volunteer Reserve  
The RAF Volunteer Reserve was a volunteer organization providing the RAF with specialists for a limited number of positions.

 Royal Air Force Volunteer Reserve
 No. 7006 Flight RAF Volunteer Reserves, RAF High Wycombe, (Linguists)
 No. 7010 Flight RAF Volunteer Reserve, RAF Wyton, (Photographic Interpretation)
 No. 7630 Flight RAF Volunteer Reserve, RAF Waddington, (Intelligence analysis)
 No. 7644 Flight RAF Volunteer Reserve, RAF Halton, (Media Operations)
 Royal Air Force Volunteer Reserve (Training Branch) providing volunteer personnel for the Air Training Corps
 Royal Air Force Volunteer Reserve (Defence Technical Undergraduate Scheme)

RAF Provost & Security Services 
The RAF Provost Marshal of the RAF Provost & Security Services had the rank of Air Commodore and was based in the Metropole building in Whitehall. At each RAF base and station a RAF Police flight was tasked with guarding and securing the base or station. The flights were administered by the following higher commands:

 RAF Provost & Security Services (P&SS) Provost Marshal, Whitehall
 HQ P&SS (UK), RAF Rudloe Manor
 HQ P&SS (Southern Region), RAF Rudloe Manor
 HQ P&SS (Northern Region), RAF Newton
 HQ P&SS (Northern Ireland), RAF Aldergrove
 HQ P&SS (Scotland), RAF Turnhouse
 RAF Police Support Squadron, RAF Rudloe Manor, (deployable RAF Police unit)
 HQ P&SS (Germany), RAF Rheindahlen, (part of RAF Germany)
 HQ P&SS (Cyprus), RAF Akrotiri, (part of British Forces Cyprus)
 HQ P&SS (Gibraltar), RAF Gibraltar, (part of British Forces Gibraltar)
 HQ P&SS (Hong Kong), RAF Sek Kong, (part of British Forces Hong Kong)
 RAF Police Training School, RAF Newton
 RAF Police Dog Training School, RAF Newton

Women's Royal Air Force 
The Women's Royal Air Force (WRAF) was the women's branch of the Royal Air Force, which provided the RAF with trained female personnel.

Princess Mary's Royal Air Force Nursing Service 
The Princess Mary's Royal Air Force Nursing Service (PMRAFNS) was the nursing branch of the Royal Air Force. The service staffed The Princess Mary's Hospital, RAF Akrotiri, RAF Hospital Ely, RAF Hospital Halton, RAF Hospital Uxbridge, RAF Hospital Wegberg and RAF Hospital Wroughton.

Royal Air Force Chaplains Branch 
The Royal Air Force Chaplains Branch provided military chaplains for the Royal Air Force. Chaplains and candidates were trained at the Royal Air Force Chaplains' School at Amport House.

RAF Legal Branch 
The RAF Legal Branch (RAFLB) was the uniformed legal service provider for the Royal Air Force. It consisted of solicitors and barristers qualified in a Commonwealth jurisdiction.

RAF Medical Services 
The RAF Medical Services provided health care at home and on deployed operations to RAF personnel. Medical officers were the doctors of the RAF and had specialist expertise in aviation medicine to support aircrew and their protective equipment.

Royal Air Force Inventory 1989 
The inventory of the RAF in 1989 consisted of the following aircraft:

 Combat aircraft:
 229x Tornado GR.1/GR.1A (Additional 26x GR.1 on order)
 165x Tornado F.2/F.3 (Additional 15x F.3 on order)
 100+ Phantom FG.1/FGR.2
 14x Phantom F-4J (UK)
 100+ Jaguar GR.1A/T.2
 80+ Harrier GR.3/T.4
 94x Harrier GR.5/GR.7 (Deliveries ongoing)
 65+ Buccaneer S.2B
 36x Nimrod MR.2
 Special mission:
 3x Nimrod Nimrod R.1
 6x Avro Shackleton AEW.2
 Sentry AEW.1 (7x on order)
 40+ Canberra PR.9/T.17
 7x Andover E.3/E.3A
 Cargo and Refueling:
 14x Victor K.2
 13x Vickers VC10 C.1
 4x/5x Vickers VC10 K.2/K.3
 9x Tristar 500 K.1/KC.1
 6x Hercules C.1K
 24x Hercules C.1/C.1P
 30x Hercules C.1/C.3
 6x Andover C.1
 6x Andover CC.2 (VIP Flight)
 2x BAe 146 CC.2 (1x on order, Queen's Flight)
 4x/2x/6x BAe 125 CC.1/CC.2/CC.3
 2x Pembroke C.1
 Helicopters:
 36x CH-47 Chinook HC.1
 41x Puma HC.1
 18x Sea King HAR.3
 65x Wessex HC.2
 2x Wessex HCC.4 (Queen's Flight)
 27x Gazelle HT.2/HT.3
 3x Gazelle HCC.4 (VIP Flight)
 Trainers:
 117x Bulldog T.1
 62x Chipmunk T.10
 163x Provost T.3A/T.5A
 160+ Hawk T.1/T.1A
 12x Hunter T.7/T.8
 20x Dominie T.1 navigation trainer
 2x Jetstream T.1
 Tucano T.1 (130x on order, deliveries beginning in December 1989)

Royal Air Force flights were equipped with four aircraft. Squadrons consisted of two to four flights, with fighter squadrons in general consisting of three flights.

See also 
 Structure of the British Armed Forces in 1989
 Structure of the British Army in 1989
 Structure of the Royal Navy in 1989

References

External links 
 Royal Air Force Website: Historic Squadrons
Senior Royal Air Force Appointments

Military units and formations of the Royal Air Force
20th-century history of the Royal Air Force
Wikipedia outlines